Labouchère is a surname, and may refer to:

 François de Labouchère (1917–1942), French pilot of World War II
 George Labouchère (1905–1999), British diplomat
 Henry Labouchère (1831–1912), English politician, writer, publisher and theatre owner
 Pierre-Antoine Labouchère (1807–1873) was a French historical painter

See also
 Labouchere (disambiguation)

French-language surnames
Surnames of French origin